GIGA Focus Afrika is a magazine published by the German Institute of Global and Area Studies. Its original title was Afrika im Blickpunkt.

External links
Afrika im Blickpunkt, archive

2002 establishments in Germany
German-language magazines
Magazines established in 2002
Magazines published in Hamburg
Political magazines published in Germany